Rajesh Gupta is an Indian politician and member of the Sixth Legislative Assembly of Delhi (M.L.A.). He has also been the Parliamentary Secretary of Health in the state. He is a member of Aam Aadmi Party and represents Wazirpur (Assembly constituency) of Delhi.

Rajesh Gupta was born on 2 November 1978 at LNJP Hospital, Delhi. He completed his schooling from Tyagi Public School. During his late teenage years he was actively involved into theatre. He generally performed street plays and nukkad nataks through which he tried to spread awareness in the society. He always wanted to do something different and contribute towards it. The Anti-corruption movement was a major icebreaker for his career in politics. He left a flourishing Shoe Business and a budding career in theatrics to join Aam Aadmi Party and started his journey of change.

He actively participated in Anti-Corruption Protest led by Anna Hazare in 2011. He did a lot of campaigning during the 2013 Assembly elections. Eventually he fought for the post of MLA in 2015 Delhi Elections and won.

Rajesh Gupta had won Delhi Assembly Elections in 2015 with a margin of 22,044 votes by defeating Dr. Mahender Nagpal of BJP and Hari Shankar Gupta of Indian National Congress (INC), both former MLAs. He had secured 61,208 votes followed by Dr. Mahender Nagpal who got 39,164 votes and Hari Shankar Gupta got 8,371 votes out of  total votes polled in this assembly constituency.

Political career
From 26 November 2012 he had been a volunteer, Aam Aadmi Party. Since 8 February 2015 he has been a spokesperson of Aam Aadmi Party.

Member of Legislative Assembly (2015 - 2020)
10 February 2015 till 2020 he was a member of the Sixth Legislative Assembly of Delhi.

Member of Legislative Assembly (2020 - present)
Since 2020, he is an elected member of the 7th Delhi Assembly.

Committee assignments of Delhi Legislative Assembly
 Member (2022-2023), Committee on Government Undertakings
 Member (2022-2023), Committee on Estimates

Electoral performance

References

See also 

Sixth Legislative Assembly of Delhi
Delhi Legislative Assembly
Government of India
Politics of India
Aam Aadmi Party

References

Delhi MLAs 2015–2020
Delhi MLAs 2020–2025
Aam Aadmi Party politicians from Delhi
People from New Delhi
Living people
Year of birth missing (living people)